CILS may refer to:

 Center for Informal Learning and Schools
 Center for International Legal Studies, an Austrian law institute
 Certificazione di Italiano come Lingua Straniera, a test of Italian as a foreign or second language
 Children of Immigrants Longitudinal Study, a study of immigrants in the United States
 CILS-FM, a Canadian radio station

See also
 CIL (disambiguation)